"A Woman in Love (It's Not Me)" is a song recorded by American rock band Tom Petty and the Heartbreakers. It was released in June 1981 as the second single from their album Hard Promises. It peaked at number 79 on the U.S. Billboard Hot 100 chart.

Billboard called it the "most dramatic track" on Hard Promises, saying that "Petty's emotion-filled vocals are delivered in classic rock fashion while the riveting guitar work gives the tune its punch." Record World praised "Petty's lonesome vocal end the forboding guitars."

Musicians
Tom Petty - lead vocals, rhythm guitar
Mike Campbell - lead guitar
Benmont Tench - keyboards
Stan Lynch - drums
Duck Dunn - bass guitar
Phil Jones - percussion

Chart performance

References

Tom Petty songs
1981 songs
Songs written by Tom Petty
Songs written by Mike Campbell (musician)
Song recordings produced by Jimmy Iovine